Chaprot Pass is a mountain pass to the northeast of Mehrbani Peak in the northwest of Chaprote, Nagar District.

References

External links
 Northern Pakistan detailed placemarks in Google Earth

Mountain passes of Gilgit-Baltistan